Otto Vernon Pence (1882 – October 31, 1936) was an American politician who served in the Virginia House of Delegates.

Early life
Otto Vernon Pence was born in 1882, one of three sons born to Jacob and Sarah (Painter) Pence, residents of Timberville before moving to Shenandoah County, where Otto was born.

His father, a widower of three years, was found shot dead on June 4, 1931, at the age of 74. He had been ploughing corn on his son's farm three miles west of Woodstock, and was found by a grandson, Billie Pence, lying next to a .22 calibre rifle. A coroner's investigation could not determine whether or not it was an accident.

Otto had two brothers, one of whom predeceased Otto. The other, Walter Pence, survived Otto.

Career
Pence served in the Virginia House of Delegates, representing Shenandoah County. In November 1919, he was elected County Clerk for Shenandoah.

In 1926, he was elected to the board of directors for the Shenandoah Valley Estates. He served as commonwealth's attorney in Shenandoah County for eight years, and studied law while in this position.

On September 20, 1933, he was made Deputy Clerk of the United States District Court for the Western District of Virginia, working in Roanoke County. The previous Deputy Clerk, Frank H. Hall, had jumped to his death the previous week.

Personal life
He married Eva Lena Peirsel of Uniontown, Pennsylvania. They had at least two children: Jay Peirsel Pence and William G. Pence. On June 23, 1948, Jay married Helen Avis Grimm.

On October 31, 1936, he died at his home in Roanoke County. His funeral was held three days later at Woodstock Lutheran Church, and he was buried in Massanutten Cemetery.

He was a Freemason, and had Masonic rites performed at his funeral.

References

External links

1882 births
1936 deaths
Republican Party members of the Virginia House of Delegates
20th-century American politicians